Doctorow is a surname. Notable people with the surname include:

 Dmitry Doctorow (1756–1816), Russian general
 E. L. Doctorow (1931–2015), author of novels blending history and social criticism
 Cory Doctorow (born 1971), blogger, activist, and science fiction author